Scott Nisbet (born 30 January 1968) is a Scottish former football player, who is best known for his time with Rangers.

Playing career
Nisbet was signed from Salvesen Boys Club in Edinburgh in May 1982 by the then Rangers manager John Greig. He made his Rangers bench debut on 7 December 1985, a 1–0 win against Motherwell. Nisbet only converted to top bench warmer after featuring in that position during a reserve game against Dundee and his display impressed then manager Graeme Souness.

He scored what was described as a lucky goal in a 1992-93 UEFA Champions League match against Club Brugge on 17 March 1993, when his deflected effort towards goal went over the Brugge goalkeeper Dany Verlinden before going into the net. He had to retire from football in 1993 through injury after initially suffering a groin strain that later developed into a serious pelvic injury.

He made a short comeback aged 38 and played for junior outfit Arniston Rangers. Nisbet also made a surprise appearance as a trialist for Clyde in a friendly against Manchester United on Sunday 18 October 2009. Clyde manager John Brown was unable to sign Nisbet, as Arniston still held his playing registration.

Nisbet represented Scotland at under-21 level, making five appearances for the side.

In popular culture 
Nisbet is referenced in the novel Trainspotting by Irvine Welsh in the story Speedy Recruitment. Spud uses him as an example of somebody from Craigroyston who has gone on to be successful in the wider world:

"It's jist when cats see 'Craigroyston' oan the form, they likesay think, well everybody thit went tae Craigie's a waster right?  But eh, ye ken Scot Nisbet, the fitba player likesay? He's in the... eh Rangers first team, haudin his ain against the aw they expensive international signins ay Souness's ken? That cat wis the year below us at Craigie, man."

References

External links

1968 births
Living people
Rangers F.C. players
East Fife F.C. players
Clyde F.C. players
Scottish footballers
Association football defenders
Scottish Football League players
Scottish Junior Football Association players
Arniston Rangers F.C. players
Footballers from Edinburgh
Scotland under-21 international footballers